The 2012–13 Biathlon World Cup was a multi-race tournament over a season of biathlon, organised by the International Biathlon Union. The season started on 25 November 2012 in Östersund, Sweden and ended on 17 March 2013 in Khanty-Mansiysk, Russia.

Calendar
Below is the IBU World Cup calendar for the 2012–13 season.

World Cup podiums

Men

Women

Men's team

Women's team

Mixed Relay

Standings: Men

Overall 

Final standings after 26 races.

Individual 

Final standings after 3 races.

Sprint 

Final standings after 10 races.

Pursuit 

Final standings after 8 races.

Mass start 

Final standings after 5 races.

Relay 

Final standings after 6 races.

Nation 

Final standings after 21 races.

Standings: Women

Overall 

Final standings after 26 races.

Individual 

Final standings after 3 races.

Sprint 

Final standings after 10 races.

Pursuit 

Final standings after 8 races.

Mass start 

Final standings after 5 races.

Relay 

Final standings after 6 races.

Nation 

Final standings after 21 races.

Standings: Mixed

Mixed Relay 

Final standings after 2 races.

Medal table

Achievements
First World Cup career victory
, 27, in his 6th season — the WC 1 Sprint in Östersund; it also was his first podium and the first podium for a Canadian male biathlete
, 23, in her 5th season — the WC 2 Pursuit in Hochfilzen; it also was her first podium
, 23, in her 4th season — the WC 3 Sprint in Pokljuka; it also was her first podium
, 22, in her 3rd season — the WC 3 Pursuit in Pokljuka; first podium was 2010-11 Sprint in Östersund
, 25, in his 2nd season — the WC 4 Sprint in Oberhof; first podium was 2011-12 Pursuit in Kontiolahti
, 26, in her 7th season — the World Championships Sprint in Nové Město; first podium was 2012-13 Sprint in Östersund
, 28, in his 9th season — the WC 7 Mass start in Holmenkollen; first podium was 2012-13 Pursuit in Pokljuka

First World Cup podium
, 24, in his 4th season — no. 3 in the WC 1 Individual in Östersund
, 25, in her 3rd season — no. 3 in the WC 1 Individual in Östersund
, 25, in her 7th season — no. 2 in the WC 1 Sprint in Östersund
, 27, in her 7th season — no. 3 in the WC 3 Sprint in Pokljuka
, 28, in his 9th season — no. 2 in the WC 3 Pursuit in Pokljuka
, 24, in her 7th season — no. 2 in the WC 4 Pursuit in Oberhof
, 29, in her 8th season — no. 2 in the World Championships Pursuit in Nové Město
, 21, in her 3rd season — no. 3 in the World Championships Mass start in Nové Město
, 21, in his 1st season — no. 3 in the WC 7 Pursuit in Holmenkollen
, 24, in his 4th season — no. 3 in the WC 8 Individual in Sochi
, 26, in his 3rd season — no. 3 in the WC 8 Sprint in Sochi

Victory in this World Cup (all-time number of victories in parentheses)

Men
 , 10 (24) first places
 , 3 (31) first places
 , 2 (8) first places
 , 2 (6) first places
 , 2 (4) first places
 , 2 (3) first places
 , 2 (2) first places
 , 1 (6) first place
 , 1 (1) first place
 , 1 (1) first place

Women
 , 11 (27) first places
 , 4 (4) first places
 , 3 (12) first places
 , 3 (3) first places
 , 1 (13) first place
 , 1 (4) first place
 , 1 (2) first place
 , 1 (1) first place
 , 1 (1) first place

Retirements
Following are notable biathletes who announced their retirement:

External links
IBU official site
World Cup results

References

 
Biathlon World Cup
World Cup
World Cup
Qualification events for the 2014 Winter Olympics
Biathlon